In the 1930 Tour de France, for the first time, the Tour was run with national teams. Belgium, Italy, Spain, Germany and France each sent a team composed of eight cyclists. Additionally, 60 cyclists started as touriste-routiers, most of them French. Some of them were grouped in regional teams.

One of the notable cyclists was Alfredo Binda, riding in the Italian national team. He had dominated the Giro d'Italia in the recent years, winning the 1925, 1927, 1928 and 1929 editions; in 1929 he had done so by winning eight consecutive stages. For the 1930 Giro d'Italia, he was paid money not to compete, so he started in the Tour de France that year. The French team was captained by Victor Fontan, who had been leading the 1929 Tour de France until he had to abandon the race due to mechanical problems. The Belgian team had Jef Demuysere as the favourite.

By team

By rider

By nationality

References

1930 Tour de France
1930